Ksenia Milevskaya and Urszula Radwańska were the defending champions, but did not compete in the juniors that year.

Polona Hercog and Jessica Moore won the tournament, defeating Lesley Kerkhove and Arantxa Rus in the final, 5–7, 6–1, [10–7].

Seeds

Draw

Finals

Top half

Bottom half

External links 
 Draw

Girls' Doubles
French Open, 2008 Girls' Doubles